Moeneeb Josephs (pronounced Muh'Neeb; born 19 May 1980) is a retired South African professional footballer who played as a goalkeeper.

Club career
Josephs began his career with Cape Town Spurs at the age of 17 in 1997 and played for its successor Ajax Cape Town for seven years. In 2006, he moved to Gauteng where he played for Bidvest Wits for two years before moving to Orlando Pirates for a record-breaking fee.

International career
Josephs has played at international level for South Africa national team and was South Africa's number one goalkeeper at the 2008 African Cup of Nations replacing the injured Rowen Fernandez.

He did not make the final squad for the 2009 FIFA Confederations Cup, but earned selection to the squad for the 2010 FIFA World Cup at Fernandez's expense. He was not expected to see much playing time as back-up to Itumeleng Khune, but on 16 June 2010 he was called on as a 79th-minute substitute for Steven Pienaar following Khune's sending-off against Uruguay. Josephs was powerless to stop the resultant penalty from Diego Forlán as Bafana Bafana lost the match 3–0 with two goals from Forlan and a stoppage-time strike from Álvaro Pereira. Khune's suspension meant that Josephs played in South Africa's final group game against France, where they won 2–1 but were eliminated from the World Cup.

On 24 May 2012, he announced his retirement from international football.

He was called back after two years by Gordon Igesund for CHAN 2014 hosted in South Africa and he played a full match in final group stage against Nigeria in 3–1 defeat in a place of injured Itumeleng Khune. That was his final game for Bafana and he was personally criticized together with Lerato Chabangu for a loss against Nigeria by Minister of Sport and Recreation Fikile Mbalula, when he said "Bafana Bafana are week, useless and they are the bunch of losers individual"."

Personal life
Josephs hails from Mitchell's Plain on the Cape Flats. Josephs is Muslim.

References

External links

1980 births
Living people
South African soccer players
Association football goalkeepers
South Africa international soccer players
2006 Africa Cup of Nations players
2008 Africa Cup of Nations players
2010 FIFA World Cup players
South African Muslims
Cape Coloureds
Bidvest Wits F.C. players
Cape Town Spurs F.C. players
Orlando Pirates F.C. players
Sportspeople from Cape Town
South Africa A' international soccer players
2014 African Nations Championship players